The Shippensburg Raiders are the athletic teams that represent Shippensburg University of Pennsylvania, located in Shippensburg, Pennsylvania, in NCAA Division II intercollegiate sports.

The Raiders are members of the Pennsylvania State Athletic Conference (PSAC) for all varsity sports. Shippensburg have been members of the PSAC since its foundation in 1951.

History 
Shippensburg University has won several regional and national athletic championships. The Dixon trophy is awarded to the top athletic program in the 18 university Pennsylvania State Athletic Conference. Shippensburg has won the trophy seven times, the most by any PSAC member. Their titles came in 1998, 1999, 2003, 2004, 2005, 2010, and 2011. SU has finished either first or second in the Dixon Trophy standings 15 times in 21 years. The women's rugby club won intercollegiate Division II national titles in 2008 and 2009. The 2011–2012 Men's rugby club were the Men's College Division I-AA Keystone Rugby Conference Champions.

Varsity teams

List of teams 

Men's sports (8)
Baseball
Basketball
Cross country
Football
Soccer
Swimming
Track and field
Wrestling

Women's sports (10)
Basketball
Cross country
Field hockey
Lacrosse
Soccer
Softball
Swimming and diving
Tennis
Track and field
Volleyball

National championships

Team

Individual sports

Field hockey 
In 2013, the women's field hockey team, under the direction of coach Bertie Landes, captured the university's first ever NCAA team championship. SU duplicated the feat in 2016, with Landes winning her final collegiate game with the Raiders.

References

External links